Acromegalomma interruptum is a bristle worm from the Sabellidae family. The body of the worm consists of a head, a cylindrical, segmented body and a tailpiece. The head consists of a prostomium (part for the mouth opening) and a peristomium (part around the mouth) and carries paired appendages (palps, antennae and cirri).

Etymology and Genus Name 
The name A. interruptum refers to the interrupted arrangement of the eyes on the radioles. Acromegalomma interruptum was originally called Megalomma interrupta, however Megalomma is already the name of a genus of beetles, which was described before. Therefore the genus in the family Sabellidae was renamed to Acromegalomma.

References 

Sabellida